Montebello is a historic home located at Charlottesville, Virginia. The central section was built in 1819–1820, and consists of three-part facade, with a three bay, two-story central block with single-story flanking wings. The original section has a single pile, brick I-house plan with a central hall flanked by a room on each side. Also on the property is a contributing -story, brick, two-car garage (c. 1920). The house was built by John M. Perry, one of the workmen
who worked with Thomas Jefferson at Monticello and on his many building projects at the
University of Virginia.  The University of Virginia purchased the house and property in 1963 and it currently serves as a residence for faculty.

It was listed on the National Register of Historic Places in 2003.

References

Houses on the National Register of Historic Places in Virginia
Houses completed in 1820
Houses in Charlottesville, Virginia
National Register of Historic Places in Charlottesville, Virginia